Flamur Tairi (born 24 November 1990 in Struga, SFR Yugoslavia)  is an ethnic Albanian footballer from Macedonian who currently plays for FC Struga.

International career
Tairi has been a member of the Macedonian U-21 team since 2008, and made his debut in the U21 on 9 September in the 0-0 draw against Norway.

References

1990 births
Living people
Sportspeople from Struga
Albanian footballers from North Macedonia
Association football midfielders
Macedonian footballers
North Macedonia under-21 international footballers
FK Makedonija Gjorče Petrov players
FK Napredok players
FK Vëllazërimi 77 players
KF Teuta Durrës players
KF Gostivari players
FK Renova players
KF Bylis Ballsh players
FC Struga players
Macedonian First Football League players
Kategoria Superiore players
Macedonian Second Football League players
Macedonian expatriate footballers
Expatriate footballers in Albania
Macedonian expatriate sportspeople in Albania